Egeon may refer to:

Dodona egeon, a butterfly found in India
Egeon Askew, English divine of the 16th and 17th centuries
Egeon, a character in A Comedy of Errors by William Shakespeare